Credit Union Service Centers (commonly known as shared branching) is an organization of credit unions that allows members of participating credit unions to process transactions at any participating branch.  As of September 2011, the network included 4,372 participating locations. While mostly composed of US based credit unions, the network is international.

Transactions 
While the transactions can vary by office, some may have fees based on an established schedule, they generally include:
 Deposits
 Withdrawals
 Loan payments
 Make transfers between accounts
 Purchasing money orders, travelers checks and official checks

Notes

External links
CU Service Centers

Credit unions of the United States